Clover Hill is an unincorporated community in Rockingham County, Virginia.

References
http://geonames.usgs.gov

Unincorporated communities in Virginia
Unincorporated communities in Rockingham County, Virginia